Mana Ahmadani, is a town and union council of Dera Ghazi Khan District in the Punjab province of Pakistan. It is located at 29°47'58N 70°35'3E and has an altitude of 111 metres (367 feet).

Mana Ahmadani has been named for Sardar Mana Khan Ahmadani Baloch, who was tribal chief of Ahmadani Baloch tribe. The prominent tribe of the town is Ahmadani Baloch.

References

Populated places in Dera Ghazi Khan District
Union councils of Dera Ghazi Khan District
Cities and towns in Punjab, Pakistan